This article presents the coats of arms of Italy.

National

Historical

Emilia-Romagna

Friuli Venezia Giulia

Campania

Lazio

Liguria

Lombardia

Marche

Piedmont

Sardinia

Sicily

Tuscany

Trentino-Alto Adige/Südtirol

Umbria

Veneto

President

Many of the Presidents of Italy have borne arms; either through inheritance, or via membership of foreign Orders of Chivalry, in particular, the Order of the Seraphim and the Order of the Elephant.

Regions

Former colonies
The coats of arms of the Italian colonies. 

This gallery include the lesser coats of arms. The years given are for the coats of arms.

See also
Coat of arms of Italy

Italy